Demirtaş is a village in the District of Yumurtalık, Adana Province, Turkey. This village is only a 9-minute drive to the ocean city of Yumurtalık.

References

Villages in Yumurtalık District